Being Jewish in France is a 2007 documentary film originally shown on French TV, about the history of Jewish life in France from the 19th century (Dreyfus Affair, 1894-1906) to the present day. The film, written and directed by French cinematographer Yves Jeuland, had its North American premiere at the Atlanta Jewish Film Festival on 21 January 2008.

References

External links

2007 television films
2007 films
French documentary television films
2000s French-language films
Documentary films about Jews and Judaism
Jews and Judaism in France
2007 documentary films
2000s French films